The annual Presidential Address to the Federal Assembly is a speech given by the Russian President to outline the state and condition in which Russia is in. It is given in front of a joint meeting of the two houses of the Russian Parliament: the State Duma and Federation Council. Article 84 of the current Constitution of Russia enacted in 1993 says "The President of the Russian Federation shall: address the Federal Assembly with annual messages on the situation in the country, on the guidelines of the internal and foreign policy of the State". First Russian President Boris Yeltsin delivered the first Address to the Federal Assembly on 24 February 1994. The date of the presidential address is not fixed.

In addition to the State Duma Deputies and Senators, in his address as there are Members of the Government, Supreme and Constitutional Courts; public and religious figures and heads of Federal subjects.

History

In the Soviet Union, prior to the institution of the post of President of the Soviet Union, such messages were not known, but their role in the political sense was played by regular Reports of the Central Committee of the Communist Party of the Soviet Union to a Congress of the CPSU.

After the presidency of the Soviet Union was established in March 1990, the amended Constitution stipulated that the USSR President "... shall deliver to the Congress of People's Deputies annual reports on the situation of the country, inform the Supreme Soviet of the most important issues of domestic and foreign policy of the Soviet Union". However, no such reports were ever delivered due to the fact that the USSR president Mikhail Gorbachev had too short time in the presidential office. Nevertheless, Gorbachev gave on 31 March 1990 with a message to the Supreme Soviet of the USSR on family issues and on 13 April that year to the Supreme Soviet of the Lithuanian SSR and the Council of Ministers of the Lithuanian SSR, which pointed out the unacceptability of a situation in which "... the republic's leadership makes all new legislative acts and decisions, which contrasted with the Lithuanian SSR and other republics of the Soviet Union as a whole ".

In the Russian Federation, the provision that the head of state addresses the highest legislative body first appeared in the Law of the RSFSR of 24 April 1991 "On the President of the RSFSR," under paragraph 3 of Article 5 of which the President "... shall at least once a year deliver a report to the Congress of People's Deputies on the implementation of socio-economic and other programs adopted by the Congress of People's Deputies of the RSFSR and the Supreme Soviet of the RSFSR, on the situation in the RSFSR, give messages to the people of the RSFSR, the Congress of People's Deputies of the RSFSR, and Supreme Soviet of the RSFSR. The Congress of People's Deputies of the RSFSR by a majority votes of the People's Deputies shall have the right to request from the President of the RSFSR an extraordinary report ".

Prior to the adoption of the Constitution of Russia in December 1993, Russian president Boris Yeltsin addressed directly the people of Russia on several occasions. Specifically, on 10 December 1992 speaking at the VII Congress of People's Deputies, he appealed to citizens to collect signatures for the initiative to hold a popular vote of confidence in the President; on 20 March 1993, he gave a televised address to the nation, in which he called the nationwide referendum for 25 April that year.

After the adoption of the Constitution of the Russian Federation in 1993, presidential addresses to the Parliament became an annual fixture. The first such message was read out on 24 February 1994.

Initially, there was a tradition to give each appeal its own title, for example: "On strengthening the Russian state" in 1994 or "What kind of Russia we are building" in 2000. However, since 2003 messages have ceased to be given specific names.

Initially, the Presidential Address to the Federal Assembly was held in the Marble Hall of the 14th building of the Kremlin. In 2008, President Dmitry Medvedev moved the Appeal in the St. George Hall of the Grand Kremlin Palace. Also, until 2008, the Chairmen of the Chambers of the Federal Assembly sitting at the podium behind the President. Since 2008, the Chairmen of the Chambers sitting among Members of the Federal Assembly.

In 2018, the message was first held outside the Kremlin. It was held in the Manege. This was due to the increasing number of participants and the need to use infographics. In 2019, the message was again held not in the Kremlin, this time the venue was chosen Gostiny Dvor.

Legal basis
From a legal perspective, neither the presidential address nor its contents become binding. Nor does law provide for a form of response to the presidential address on the part of the Federal Assembly.

By its nature, a presidential address could not be regarded as a legal document of the President, as the Constitution provides for only two types of instruments issued by the head of state, namely by decree, and executive order. At the same time, such address is an important political and policy document addressed, in fact, not only to Parliament but to all other authorities in the Russian Federation, to society as a whole. Therefore, they feature such messages as political acts with elements of the regulatory functions or as a regulatory and political form of the head of state.

Content and form of the address is at the discretion of the President and are not regulated by any rules, except for the fact that the Federal Law of July 20, 1995 № 115-FZ "On State Forecasting and programs of socio-economic development of the Russian Federation" established the following requirement: "Annual Message of the President of the Russian Federation, with whom he addresses the Federal Assembly, shall contain a special section devoted to the analysis of the program of socio-economic development of Russia's medium-term and refinement of the program with the allocation of tasks for the coming year" (Part 2 items . 5).  However, in practice this requirement is not met. House of the Federal Assembly on the results of the hearing of Presidential addresses often make special provisions for implementing the planned legislative activities in the messages.).

Federal executive bodies also respond to the message the head of state adoption of the relevant legal acts, which are set up to the task set by the President. Paragraph 2.1 of the Model Rules of the internal organization of the federal bodies of executive power, approved by the Government of the Russian Federation, provided that "the planning of the federal executive body for the main activities carried out on the basis of the Message of the President of the Russian Federation Federal Assembly, the Budget message of the President of the Russian Federation Federal Assembly ... ".

The subjects of the Russian Federation in the development of the provisions of the Message are also taking their regulations. All this testifies to the significant role played by the message of the President, not only politically but also in law-making process.

List

Notes

See also
 State of the Nation (disambiguation), for addresses by heads of state
 Speech from the throne
 State Opening of Parliament in the United Kingdom
 State of the Union Address in the United States

References

Speeches by heads of state
Politics of Russia
Government of Russia
Recurring events established in 1994